Slovincian is the extinct language formerly spoken by the Slovincians living between lakes Gardno and Łebsko near Słupsk in Pomerania.

Slovincian is classified either as a language (first by Friedrich Lorentz, 1902/3), or as a Kashubian dialect (first by Lorentz, after 1903) or variant, with Kashubian itself being classified either as a language or as a Polish dialect. Slovincian and Kashubian are both classified as Pomeranian.

Slovincian became extinct in the early twentieth century. However, individual words and expressions survived until after World War II, when the region became Polish. Some Slovincians were expelled along with the Germans. Of those allowed to stay, a few elderly people had fragmentary knowledge of Slovincian until the 1950s.

It is disputed whether Slovincians actually used that name, given to them by the Russian academic Aleksander Hilferding, for themselves. The synonym Lebakaschuben is also used. Some scholars believe that Slovincians regarded themselves merely as Lutheran Kashubians and their language as Kashubian. Nevertheless, the name "Slovincian" prevails in literature and is also used officially, for example in Słowiński Park Narodowy (Slovincian National Park), a protected area on the Polish Pomeranian coast.

Phonology

Accent
Slovincian is particularly important to Slavic accentologists because, together with the closely related northern Kashubian dialects, it is the only part of West Slavic to retain the free accent from Proto-Slavic. The accent was stress-based, free (ˈkolo, vječˈeřa, gen. pl. břegˈōv). The length was distinctive (ˈstrava "food" ≠ ˈtrāva "grass"). Stress can be enclinomenic and mobile (ˈvoda "water", ˈza vodą "for water", vodˈǭ "with water") or bound (rˈiba, za rˈibą, rˈibǭ). Beside accent, vowel length can also alternate within the paradigm (mlˈocic "to trash, hit", 2nd. person present mlˈōcīš). The syllable is always long before a voiced final consonant (břēg "hill", but ˈbřegū).

The small number of oxytones has been considered both an archaism and an innovation, while the quantity distinction by stress is a conservative feature shared with Slovene and Serbo-Croatian. There are two accentual paradigms in Slovincian, a fixed and a mobile one, with the mobile one resulting in a stress alternation only within the stem, not the ending.

Grammar

Slovincian grammar is preserved in the  compiled in 1903 by Friedrich Lorentz, who in 1908–1912 also published , a Slovincian dictionary.

History 

The ancestors of the Slovincians, the West Slavic Pomeranians, moved in after the Migration Period. Following the Ostsiedlung, the Slovincians like most of the other Wends gradually became Germanized. The adoption of Lutheranism in the Duchy of Pomerania in 1534 distinguished the Slovincians from the Kashubes in Pomerelia, who remained Roman Catholic. In the 16th century, "Slovincian" was also applied to the Slavic speakers in the Bytów (Bütow) region further south.

In the 16th and 17th century Michael Brüggemann (also known as Pontanus or Michał Mostnik), Simon Krofey (Szimon Krofej) and J.M. Sporgius introduced Kashubian into the Lutheran Church. Krofey, pastor in Bytów (Bütow), published a religious song book in 1586, written in Polish but also containing some Kashubian words. Brüggemann, pastor in Schmolsin, published a Polish translation of some works of Martin Luther and biblical texts, also containing Kashubian elements. Other biblical texts were published in 1700 by Sporgius, pastor in Schmolsin. His Schmolsiner Perikopen, most of which is written in the same Polish-Kashubian style of Krofey's and Brüggemann's books, also contain small passages ("6th Sunday after Epiphanias") written in pure Kashubian.

Hilferding (1862) and Parczewski (1896) confirmed a progressive language shift in the Kashubian population from their Slavonic vernacular to the local German dialect (Low German Ostpommersch or High German, in eastern Kashubian areas also Low German Low Prussian).

By the 1920s, the Slovincian villages had become linguistically German, though a Slovincian consciousness remained. The area remained within the borders of Germany until becoming part of Poland after World War II ended in 1945 and the area became Polish. Some Slovincians were expelled along with the German population, some were allowed to remain. In the 1950s, mainly in the village of Kluki (formerly Klucken), a few elderly people still remembered fragments of Slovincian.

Slovincians began to ask for the right to emigrate to West Germany, and virtually all of the remaining Slovincian families had emigrated there by the 1980s.

See also 
 Kashubian language
 Old Prussian language

References

Further reading
Two articles about the Slovincians after 1945, in German

External links 
 History of Kluki – Slovincian Village

Languages of Poland
Languages of Germany
West Slavic languages
Slovician
History of Pomerania
Extinct languages of Europe
Languages extinct in the 20th century
Extinct Slavic languages